In the Korisliiga, the top Finnish professional basketball league, two awards are considered the Most Valuable Player award. The first, the Player of the Year, goes to the best Finnish player in the league. The second, is the Best Foreigner (in Finnish, vuoden ulkomaalaisvahvistus).

Key

Import Players

Finnish Players

Notes

References

Basketball most valuable player awards
MVP
European basketball awards